The chowchilla (Orthonyx spaldingii) is a passerine bird in the family Orthonychidae.  It is endemic to Australia.

Taxonomy
In their 1999 study, Schodde and Mason recognise two adjoining subspecies, O. s. spaldingii and O. s. melasmenus with a zone of intergradation.

Description

Unmistakable thrush-like, ground-dwelling, birds.  Males and females largely dark brown with white eye-ring, tail-feather shafts extend as spines beyond feather-vanes; males with white throat, breast and belly; females with bright rufous throat and upper breast, white lower breast and belly.

Distribution and habitat
The chowchilla is restricted to upland and lowland tropical rainforests of north-eastern Queensland.

Behaviour

Diet
Mainly invertebrates, but also small vertebrates.

Voice
Continuous chattering, singing and other complex vocalisations.

Breeding
Nests on or near ground, often on ferns, stumps or logs. Builds a bulky, dome-shaped stick-nest with a clutch of one, possibly sometimes two, white eggs.

Gallery

References

 BirdLife International. (2007). Species factsheet: Orthonyx spaldingii.
 Higgins, P.J.; & Peter, J.M. (eds). (2003). Handbook of Australian, New Zealand and Antarctic Birds.  Volume 6: Pardalotes to Shrike-thrushes. Oxford University Press: Melbourne.

External links
Image at ADW 

Orthonyx
Birds of Cape York Peninsula
Endemic birds of Australia
Birds described in 1868